The 2018 Honda Indy Grand Prix of Alabama was the fourth round of the 2018 IndyCar Series season contested at Barber Motorsports Park in Birmingham, Alabama. The race started on April 22nd and was stopped due to rain on lap 22. It was resumed on Monday, April 23rd at 11:30 am as a timed race which went 82 laps out of a scheduled 90. American Josef Newgarden qualified on pole for the event. He eventually took victory for his third IndyCar win in Alabama.

Results

Qualifying

Race

Notes:
 Points include 1 point for leading at least 1 lap during a race, an additional 2 points for leading the most race laps, and 1 point for Pole Position.

Championship standings after the race

Drivers' Championship standings

Manufacturer standings

 Note: Only the top five positions are included.

References

Grand Prix of Alabama
Honda Indy Grand Prix of Alabama

Honda Indy Grand Prix of Alabama
Honda Indy Grand Prix